Jean Carolyn Guerrero (born March 31, 1988) is an American investigative journalist, author, essayist, columnist and former foreign correspondent. She is the author of Crux: A Cross-Border Memoir, winner of the PEN/FUSION Emerging Writers Prize, and Hatemonger: Stephen Miller, Donald Trump, and the White Nationalist Agenda, published in 2020 by William Morrow. Guerrero's KPBS series America's Wall won an Emmy Award. Her essay, "My Father Says He's a 'Targeted Individual.' Maybe We All Are", was selected for The Best American Essays anthology of 2019.

Career 
From 2010 to 2013, Guerrero was a Mexico City bureau correspondent for The Wall Street Journal and Dow Jones Newswires, reporting on Mexico and Central America. She was an investigative reporter for KPBS in San Diego from 2015 to 2019. Guerrero is a regular contributor to NPR, PBS NewsHour and PRI's The World, with appearances on Democracy Now!, MSNBC and CBC among others. Her writing has appeared in The New York Times, the Columbia Journalism Review, Vanity Fair, Wired, The Daily Beast, The Nation and other outlets. Guerrero is an opinion columnist for the Los Angeles Times.

Education 
Guerrero graduated from The Bishop's School (La Jolla), received a B.A. in journalism with a minor in neuroscience from the University of Southern California and an M.F.A. in creative nonfiction from Goucher College.

Crux: A Cross-Border Memoir
Crux: A Cross-Border Memoir was published in 2018 by One World: Random House. Reviewed as "a gracefully written and nuanced memoir" in The Washington Post, the book is an exploration of borders, Guerrero's father, and Guerrero's own sense of self. The book is divided into seven segments corresponding to parts of the K'iche' Maya creation story in the Popul Vuh.

Hatemonger: Stephen Miller, Donald Trump, and the White Nationalist Agenda 
Hatemonger was published by William Morrow: HarperCollins in 2020. "An unsparing portrait of the young architect of Trumpian nationalism," per Kirkus Reviews, "carefully documented and persuasive. A readable study in the banality of evil, even if it comes clothed in bespoke suits." Author Francisco Cantú reviewed Hatemonger as "A vital book for understanding the still-unfolding nightmare of nationalism and racism in the 21st century."

Works 
 Crux: A Cross-Border Memoir. One World, 2018. 
 Hatemonger: Stephen Miller, Donald Trump, and the White Nationalist Agenda. William Morrow, 2020.

Awards 

PEN/FUSION Emerging Writers Prize for Crux: A Cross-Border Memoir
Emmy Award from the National Academy of Television Arts & Sciences Pacific Southwest Chapter for the series America's Wall
 San Diego Press Club Excellence in Journalism Award for Investigative Reporting: Investors in Donald Trump's Failed Mexico Resort Speak Out
 San Diego Society of Professional Journalists 2019 Journalist of the Year

Personal life 
Guerrero lives in La Mesa, California. Her mother is a physician, and her sister Michelle Ruby is a painter and muralist.

External links 

 Personal website
 Twitter page

References 

American women journalists
Emmy Award winners
1988 births
Living people
University of Southern California alumni
Goucher College alumni
21st-century American women